Konan Serge Kouadio (born 31 December 1988, in Abidjan) is an Ivorian footballer, who currently plays for Moroccan side Widad Fez.

Career
He plays as a striker. He began his career with Académie de Sol Beni and was promoted in 2006 to ASEC Mimosas, before joining Charlton Athletic. For work permit reasons, he was loaned out to Fredrikstad F.K. In July 2008, he was loaned out from Charlton to AS Cherbourg.

References

Ivorian footballers
Charlton Athletic F.C. players
Fredrikstad FK players
ASEC Mimosas players
AS Cherbourg Football players
Expatriate footballers in England
Expatriate footballers in Norway
Expatriate footballers in France
Expatriate footballers in Morocco
Ivorian expatriate footballers
1988 births
Living people
Footballers from Abidjan
COD Meknès players
Association football midfielders
Academie de Foot Amadou Diallo players